Anthostella is a genus of sea anemones in the family Actiniidae. It has two described species.

References

Actiniidae
Hexacorallia genera